Cangelosi is a surname. Notable people with the surname include:

John Cangelosi (born 1963), American baseball player
Theo Cangelosi (1911–1992), American lawyer, banker, businessman, and politician
Fabiano Cangelosi, Australian barrister

Italian-language surnames